Gangulys Wed Guhas is a 2021 Indian Bengali language romance drama web series written and directed by Samadarshi Dutta.

The main cast in the series are Saumya Sengupta, Ebong Ipsita, Romi Choudhuri, Biplab Bandyopadhyay, Sudipa Basu, Samadarshi Dutta, Amrita Chattopadhyay, Subhrajit Dutta, Kaushiki, and Jayati Chakraborty. The web series is produced under Orange & Yellow Films.

Synopsis
The Gangulys, who still reside as a single family in their old Nilmoni Mitra Lane home, are very different from the Guhas who now reside at Ballygunge Place. The "artsy" Bengali family the Guhas can practically all dance kathak, sing rabindra sangeet, and watch plays at Tolly club while enjoying wine and cheese. The Ganguly family, on the other hand, is a long-established North Calcutta "Bonedi" family that still takes great pride in its collection of antique furniture and ties to the Cooch Behar royal line. They have an air of fake intellectual superiority about them and are a "joint family" of distinguished advocates, physicians, and engineers. Despite how different the two families are from one another, they end up together.

The narrative follows the entire wedding process, from Paka Dekha and Aiburo bhaat through the reception and how these families ultimately reconcile amid rising tension, funny mishaps, rib-tickling secrets, unplanned romantic reunions, and youthful love.

Reception
IMDB rated this series 9.2 out of 10.

Cast
Saumya Sengupta
Ebong Ipsita
Romi Choudhuri
Biplab Bandyopadhyay
Sudipa Basu
Samadarshi Dutta
Amrita Chattopadhyay 
Kaushiki
Jayati Chakraborty
Subhrajit Dutta

Episodes

Soundtrack
Gangulys Wed Guhas (Original Score from the series) The songs in the series are sung by Sravan Bhattacharyya, Jayanti Bhattacharyya, Soumya Murshidabadi, Amrita Singh and Ujjaini Mukherjee. And music is composed by Ritam Sen.

References

External links 
 

Indian romance television series
Bengali-language web series
Indian web series
2021 films